The 1974 U.S. Open was the 74th U.S. Open, held June 13–16 at Winged Foot Golf Club in Mamaroneck, New York, a suburb northeast of New York City. In what became known as the "Massacre at Winged Foot," Hale Irwin's score of 287 (+7) was good enough for the first of his three U.S. Open titles, two strokes ahead of runner-up Forrest Fezler.

Tom Watson shot a third-round 69 to hold a one-stroke lead over Irwin after 54 holes. In the final round, Watson bogeyed holes 4, 5, and 8 on the front and six more on the back for a 79 (+9) and fell into a tie for fifth. Still at the beginning of his career, it was the first top ten finish in a major for the future U.S. Open champion. Irwin bogeyed 15 and 16, and  needed a 10-footer (3 m) to save par at 17. With a two-shot lead heading to the 18th, Irwin hit his approach to the center of the green and two-putted for par and the championship.

Winged Foot played extremely difficult throughout the tournament, leading sportswriter Dick Schaap to coin the phrase "The Massacre at Winged Foot," the title of his book. Not a single player broke par in the first round, and Irwin's 7-over was the second-highest since World War II (Julius Boros was 9-over in 1963). Many complained that the USGA had intentionally made the course setup treacherous in response to Johnny Miller's record-breaking 63 the year before.

Arnold Palmer finished five strokes back in a tie for fifth, his final top-5 finish in a major championship. Ken Venturi, 1964 champion, played in his final major and missed the cut.

Sam Snead, age 62, broke a rib during practice on Wednesday and withdrew.

This was the third of six U.S. Opens at Winged Foot's West Course; it previously hosted in 1929 and 1959, then returned in 1984, 2006, and 2020. It also hosted the PGA Championship in 1997.

Course layout

Past champions in the field

Made the cut 

Source:

Missed the cut 

Source:

Round summaries

First round
Thursday, June 13, 1974

Source:

Second round
Friday, June 14, 1974

Source:

Third round
Saturday, June 15, 1974

Source:

Final round
Sunday, June 16, 1974

Source:

Scorecard

Cumulative tournament scores, relative to par

Source:

References

External links
USGA Championship Database

U.S. Open (golf)
Golf in New York (state)
Mamaroneck, New York
U.S. Open
U.S. Open (golf)
Army New York (state)|U.S. Open (golf)
U.S. Open (golf)